Gromovo is a airbase of the Russian Air Force located at Gromovo, Leningrad Oblast, Russia.

The base was home to the 180th Guards Fighter Aviation Regiment flying the Mikoyan MiG-31 (NATO: Foxhound) between 1953 and 2002 and is currently home to the 33rd Independent Transport Composite Aviation Regiment.

References

Soviet Air Force bases
Russian Air Force bases
Soviet Air Defence Force bases
Airports in Leningrad Oblast